Danjon is a lunar impact crater on the far side of the Moon. It lies less than a crater diameter to the east-southeast of the larger crater Langemak. To the east-northeast of Danjon is the crater Perepelkin, and due south lies the walled plain Fermi.

The northeastern rim of Danjon is overlain by the smaller crater D'Arsonval. Danjon overlies the southeastern corner of the slightly smaller satellite crater Danjon X. The outer rim of this crater is worn and eroded, particularly at the southern end, and the interior floor is irregular and marked by several small craterlets.

Satellite craters
By convention these features are identified on lunar maps by placing the letter on the side of the crater midpoint that is closest to Danjon.

References

 
 
 
 
 
 
 
 
 
 
 
 

Impact craters on the Moon